Utah State Route 85 may refer to:

 The Mountain View Corridor (State Route 85), a state highway in northwestern Utah County, and western Salt Lake County, Utah, United States
 Utah State Route 85 (1960-1977), a former state highway in southeastern Box Elder and Cache counties, Utah, United States that ran northeasterly from I-15 near Brigham City to the Idaho border near Franklin, Idaho
 Utah State Route 85 (1945-1953), a former state highway in south-central Box Elder County, Utah, United States that ran east from SR-41 (now SR-13) in Riverside to SR-154

See also
 List of state highways in Utah
 List of highways numbered 85